Nikolaus Schienen (1491–1556) was a Roman Catholic prelate who served as Auxiliary Bishop of Trier (1519–1556).

Biography
Nikolaus Schienen was born Zell, Germany in 1491. On 29 Oct 1519, he was appointed during the papacy of Pope Leo X as Auxiliary Bishop of Trier and Titular Bishop of Azotus. He served as Auxiliary Bishop of Trier until his death on 21 Aug 1556. While bishop, he was the principal consecrator of Johann von Metzenhausen, Archbishop of Trier (1532).

References 

16th-century Roman Catholic bishops in the Holy Roman Empire
Bishops appointed by Pope Leo X
1491 births
1556 deaths